Eliot is a neighborhood in the North and Northeast sections of Portland, Oregon.  It is approximately bounded by the Willamette River on the west, NE Fremont Street on the north, NE 7th Avenue on the east, and NE/N Broadway on the south.

The neighborhood contains the old center of the former City of Albina before it was annexed by Portland in the late 19th century. Eliot was named in honor of  Rev. Thomas L. Eliot, a pioneer minister.

Schools 
Three schools serve the neighborhood: Boise-Eliot/Humboldt Elementary School, Harriet Tubman Middle School, and Jefferson High School.

Parks 

 Lillis-Albina Park
 Dawson Park

Points of interest 
The Wonder Ballroom hosts concerts and other events at 128 NE Russell Street. The building was completed in 1914 as the meeting place for the local members of the Ancient Order of Hibernians. In 2004, the building was added to the National Register of Historic Places.

Legacy Emanuel Medical Center is one of only two Level I trauma centers in Oregon. It was founded in 1912 as Emanuel Hospital by the First Immanuel Lutheran Church of Portland. During the hospital's 1972 expansion, 300 homes and businesses were razed, displacing Black families that had lived in the area since the founding of Albina. Those families and their descendants formed the Emanuel Displaced Persons Association and its successor organization, EDPA2.

References

External links
 
 Eliot Neighborhood Website
Eliot Street Tree Inventory Report

 
Neighborhoods in Portland, Oregon
North Portland, Oregon
Northeast Portland, Oregon